Patient portals are healthcare-related online applications that allow patients to interact and communicate with their healthcare providers, such as physicians and hospitals. Typically, portal services are available on the Internet at all hours of the day and night. Some patient portal applications exist as stand-alone web sites and sell their services to healthcare providers.  Other portal applications are integrated into the existing web site of a healthcare provider. Still others are modules added onto an existing electronic medical record (EMR) system.  What all of these services share is the ability of patients to interact with their medical information via the Internet. Currently, the lines between an EMR, a personal health record, and a patient portal are blurring. For example, Intuit Health and Microsoft HealthVault describe themselves as personal health records (PHRs), but they can interface with EMRs and communicate through the Continuity of Care Record standard, displaying patient data on the Internet so it can be viewed through a patient portal.

Features and benefits 

The central feature that makes any system a patient portal is the ability to expose individual patient health information in a secure manner through the Internet. In addition, virtually all patient portals allow patients to interact in some way with health care providers. Patient portals benefit both patients and providers by increasing efficiency and productivity. Patient portals are also regarded as a key tool to help physicians meet "meaningful use" requirements in order to receive federal incentive checks, especially for providing health information to patients.
Some patient portal applications enable patients to register and complete forms online, which can streamline visits to clinics and hospitals. Many portal applications also enable patients to request prescription refills online, order eyeglasses and contact lenses, access medical records, pay bills, review lab results, and schedule medical appointments. Patient portals also typically allow patients to communicate directly with healthcare providers by asking questions, leaving comments, or sending e-mail messages.

Disadvantages 

The major shortcoming of most patient portals is their linkage to a single health organization. If a patient uses more than one organization for healthcare, the patient normally needs to log on to each organization's portal to access information. This results in a fragmented view of individual patient data.

Practice portals 
Portal applications for individual practices typically exist in tandem with patient portals, allowing access to patient information and records, as well as schedules, payments, and messages from patients. Most patient portals require the practice to have some type of electronic medical record or patient management system, as the patient data needs to be stored in a data repository then retrieved by the patient portal.
While lauding its ease-of-use, some physicians note that it is hard to encourage patients to utilize online portals to benefit both themselves and the medical practice staff.

Security 

Health care providers in the US are bound to comply with HIPAA regulations.  These regulations specify what patient information must be held in confidence.  Something as seemingly trivial as a name is viewed by HIPAA as protected health information.  For this reason, security has always been a top concern for the industry when dealing with the adoption of patient portals.  While there may be systems that are not HIPAA compliant, certainly most patient and practice portals are secure and compliant with HIPAA regulations.  The use of SSL and access control patterns are commonplace in the industry.  Patient access is typically validated with a user name and password.

History 

Internet portal technology has been in common use since the 1990s.  The financial industry has been particularly adept at using the Internet to grant individual users access to personal information.  Possibly because of the strictness of HIPAA regulations, or the lack of financial incentives for the health care providers, the adoption of patient portals has lagged behind other market segments.

The American Recovery and Reinvestment Act of 2009 (ARRA), in particular the HITECH Act within ARRA, sets aside approximately $19 billion for health information technology.  This funding will potentially offset the costs of electronic medical record systems for practicing physicians.  Because the conversion to electronic medical records is typically complex, systems often transition to patient portals first and then follow with a complete implementation of electronic medical records.

To attest to Meaningful Use Stage 2, eligible professionals must have 5 percent of their patients view, transmit or download their health information. Additionally, providers must implement notifications for follow up appointments and identify clinically relevant health information for more than 10 percent of their patients with two or more appointments in the preceding two years.

Consequently, personal health record systems are becoming more common and available. In 2012, 57 percent of providers already had a patient portal in place. At present, individual health data are located primarily on paper in physicians' files. Patient portals have been developed to give patients better access to their information.  Given the patient mobility and the development of clear interoperable standards, the best documentation of patient medical history may involve data stored outside physician offices.

Future 

E-visits (remote use of medical services) may soon become one of the most commonly used options of patient portals.  The most likely demographic for uptake of e-visits are patients who live in remote rural areas, far from clinical services. An Internet session would be much cheaper and more convenient than traveling a long distance, especially for simple questions or minor medical complaints.

Providing a route that does not require in-person patient visits to a clinic may potentially benefit both patients and providers. Many organizations find that overall utilization drops when e-visits are implemented, in some places by as much as 25%. This makes e-visits a very interesting proposition for insurance companies, although few actually re-imburse for them currently. E-visits, with the proper functionality, also allow the patient to update their allergies, vital signs, and history information.

Vendors 

Some vendors, such as athenahealth, Epic Systems and Cerner offer patient portals as one module of a complete Electronic Health Record (EHR) system. Other vendors, such as Allscripts and Medfusion, offer patient portals that can be integrated with any EHR.

Recent market surveys have highlighted best of breed, or applications that excel at one or two functions, are losing ground to portals provided by large vendors. While best of breed portals are better equipped for interoperability, portals supplied by larger vendors may be overall better equipped to handle the patient engagement requirements of Meaningful Use Stage 2.

See also 
 Health care
 Health informatics
 Electronic health record
 Personal health record

References

External links
What is a patient portal? at HealthIT.gov
What is a patient engagement? at Evariant

Telemedicine
Health informatics
Medical websites
Electronic health records
Patient